The 2004–05 C.D. Marathón season in the Honduran football league was divided into two halves, Apertura and Clausura. Marathón was capable to win one tournament, having achieved the fifth championship in their history.

Apertura

Squad

Standings

Matches

Results by round

Regular season

Semifinals

 Marathón won 3–2 on aggregate.

Final

Olimpia vs Marathón

 Marathón won 5-3 on aggregate score.

Clausura

Squad

Standings

Matches

Results by round

Regular season

Semifinals

 Marathón 1–1 Universidad on aggregate score; Marathón advanced on better Regular season performance.

Final

 Olimpia won 3–1 on aggregate.

References

External links
Marathon Official Website 

CD
C.D. Marathón seasons